Ragasiya Police is a 1995 Indian Tamil language action thriller film written and directed by R. S. Elavarasan. The film stars R. Sarathkumar and Nagma, while Raadhika, Anandaraj, Goundamani, Devan, and Senthil play supporting roles. It was released on 23 October 1995 and bombed at the box-office.

Plot

The film begins with the murder of a politician committed by the domestic terrorist Azhagam Perumal. The corrupt home minister Ponnurangam wants to become the state Chief Minister. He was one of the four founders of the ruling party, yet he has not become the CM, while his co-founders and junior have become the CM. Therefore, he orders Azhagam Perumal for money to create chaos in Tamil Nadu. Azhagam Perumal first sets off a bomb in the head office of the State's major opposition party. 22 people died during the bomb blast. Consequently, the incumbent Chief Minister charges the new Anti Terrorist Squad's Assistant Commissioner, Suriya, to track down the terrorist group. Meanwhile, Suriya and Raji fall in love with each other.

Raji's brother Dinesh is the one who has been tracking Azhagam Perumal for the last six months, before the blast. Though he is a close friend of Suriya, he is hurt when Suriya is given his case. Two of Azhagam Perumal's attempts to kill the CM goes in vain due to Suriya, and Suriya gets injured in the second attempt. Azhagam Perumal tells Ponnurangam to either remove Suriya from his path or find another guy to kill the CM. Ponnurangam, using his power as Home Minister and citing Suriya's injury, transfers him to the Anti-Prostitution Department. Dinesh is again given the responsibility of the case, and after misinterpreting a conversation between Suriya and the city commissioner, he gets angry with Suriya. Suriya then arrests Ezhilarasi, Ponnurangam's illegal concubine, who is the head of a huge brothel. Then, Suriya accidentally comes across Dinesh trying to capture a terrorist in the central station, and the police attempt goes awry. Dinesh begins to despise Suriya.

Then, Suriya is framed for going to a brothel when he was on an undercover attempt; therefore, he is suspended. An attempt is made on his life, which he escapes, but Dinesh is killed in his house, and Suriya's mother is also killed in a blast at his home. Suriya and Raji go and complain about Ponnurangam to the CM, but she is unable to do anything immediately as she is going on a state visit to Seychelles. Suriya accompanies her as her chief bodyguard. Meanwhile, Ponnurangam is watching the TV show of the CM's visit, waiting for her death, as he would immediately become the acting CM and then the CM. Raji comes there and holds Ponnurangam at gunpoint, but he snatches her gun and holds her at bay. An attempt is made on the CM's life, but Suriya still saves her and captures the disguised Azhagam Perumal. Ponnurangam commits suicide upon hearing that Azhagam Perumal was captured. All ends well.

Cast

R. Sarathkumar as ACP Suriya IPS
Nagma as Raji, Surya's love interest
Raadhika as Chief Minister of Tamil Nadu
Anandaraj as Azhagam Perumal, a domestic terrorist
Goundamani as Ponnurangam, Home Minister of Tamil Nadu
Devan as ACP Dinesh, Raji's brother
Senthil as Harichandran, Ponnurangam's personal assistant
Vinu Chakravarthy as Dharmaraj, Chennai Police Commissioner
Sangeeta as Suriya's mother
Vichithra as Ezhilarasi, Ponnurangam's concubine and leader of a big brothel
S. N. Lakshmi
Mahanadi Shankar
R. N. Sudarshan
R. N. K. Prasad
Jyothi Meena as item number
Kavithasri
Bindiya
Muthukumar
Krishnamoorthy
Raviraj
O. A. K. Sundar

Production
Ragasiya Police marked the directorial debut of Ilavarasan, a film institute student. The filming of songs were held at France and Switzerland.

Soundtrack

The film score and the soundtrack were composed by famous Bollywood composer-duo Laxmikant–Pyarelal. The soundtrack, released in 1995, features 6 tracks with lyrics written by Vaali.

Reception
Thulasi of Kalki wrote it is a film that does not disappoint the fans who are expecting 100% entertainment.

References

1995 films
Films scored by Laxmikant–Pyarelal
1990s Tamil-language films
Fictional portrayals of the Tamil Nadu Police
Films set in Seychelles
Films shot in Seychelles
1990s police procedural films
Indian action thriller films
1995 action thriller films